Alpha Delta Theta may refer to:

Alpha Delta Theta (professional), a professional sorority in the field of medical technology
Alpha Delta Theta (social), a social sorority which operated from 1919 to 1939